The 1912 Rice Grays football team was an American football team that represented Rice Institute as an independent during the 1912 college football season. The team compiled a 3–2 record and was outscored by a total of 125 to 40.

Rice Institute opened its doors in the fall of 1912, and its first football team was made up of 21 students from the incoming freshmen class. In its first game, the team defeated Houston High School by a 7–6 score. In its first intercollegiate football game, the team defeated  by a 20–6 score in Huntsville, Texas.

Philip Arbuckle was hired in 1912 as the football coach and the head of the entire Rice athletic program. Arbuckle was at the time a 28-year-old Illinois native and University of Chicago graduate.

The team played its two home games during the 1912 season at West End Park in Houston. Plans were set in motion to build athletic field on the campus with seating for 12,000 persons to be opened in 1913.

At the end of the 1912 season, end George Journeay was selected to be the captain of the 1913 Rice team.

Schedule

References

Rice
Rice Owls football seasons
Rice Grays football